Luiz Azeredo (born 10 June 1976) is a Brazilian retired mixed martial artist. He fought in the PRIDE Fighting Championships and Cage Rage.

Mixed martial arts career
On 22 November 2008 he participated in Shoot Boxing World Tournament 2008, where he reached the semi-finals and was defeated by defending champion Kenichi Ogata. He is most notable for being the first person to defeat Anderson Silva in an MMA bout.

Bellator
Azeredo made his Bellator debut at Bellator 33 winning against formerly undefeated, Edward Guedes. He won the fight after dominating all three rounds, as he got the unanimous decision win. With the win, Azeredo was offered a spot in the Season 4 lightweight tournament and lost to Renê Nazare.

Mixed martial arts record

|-
| Loss
| align=center| 15–10
| Renê Nazare
| TKO (arm injury)
| Bellator 39
| 
| align=center| 1
| align=center| 5:00
| 
| 
|-
| Win
| align=center| 15–9
| Edward Guedes
| Decision (unanimous)
| Bellator 33
| 
| align=center| 3
| align=center| 5:00
| 
| 
|-
| Win
| align=center| 14–9
| Niko Puhakka
| Decision (unanimous)
| Fight Festival 28
| 
| align=center| 3
| align=center| 5:00
| 
| 
|-
| Loss
| align=center| 13–9
| Mikhail Malyutin
| Decision (unanimous)
| Ring of Combat 31 
| 
| align=center| 3
| align=center| 5:00
| 
| 
|-
| Win
| align=center| 13–8
| Brandon Adamson
| Submission (rear-naked choke)
| UCC 3: Urban Conflict Championship Fights
| 
| align=center| 1
| align=center| 3:06
| 
| 
|-
| Loss
| align=center| 12–8
| Ronys Torres
| Submission (kimura)
| Jungle Fight 10
| 
| align=center| 1
| align=center| 4:34
| 
| 
|-
| Win
| align=center| 12–7
| Milton Vieira
| Decision (unanimous)
| The One: VIP Fighting
| 
| align=center| 3
| align=center| N/A
| 
| 
|-
| Loss
| align=center| 11–7
| Tatsuya Kawajiri
| Decision (unanimous)
| Yarennoka!
| 
| align=center| 2
| align=center| 5:00
| 
| 
|-
| Win
| align=center| 11–6
| Paul Daley
| Decision (unanimous)
| Cage Rage 19
| 
| align=center| 3
| align=center| 5:00
| 
| 
|-
| Loss
| align=center| 10–6
| Joachim Hansen
| KO (knee)
| Pride - Bushido 10
| 
| align=center| 1
| align=center| 7:09
| 
| 
|-
| Loss
| align=center| 10–5
| Takanori Gomi
| Decision (unanimous)
| PRIDE Bushido 9
| 
| align=center| 2
| align=center| 5:00
| 
| 
|-
| Win
| align=center| 10–4
| Naoyuki Kotani
| KO (punches)
| PRIDE Bushido 9
| 
| align=center| 1
| align=center| 0:11
| 
| 
|-
| Loss
| align=center| 9–4
| Takanori Gomi
| KO (punches)
| PRIDE Bushido 7
| 
| align=center| 1
| align=center| 3:46
| 
| 
|-
| Win
| align=center| 9–3
| Luiz Firmino
| Decision (split)
| PRIDE Bushido 6
| 
| align=center| 2
| align=center| 5:00
| 
| 
|-
| Win
| align=center| 8–3
| Regiclaudio Macedo
| TKO (punches)
| SS 5: Storm Samurai 5
| 
| align=center| 2
| align=center| 2:23
| 
| 
|-
| Win
| align=center| 7–3
| Eduardo Simões
| TKO (punches and stomp)
| SS 4: Storm Samurai 4
| 
| align=center| 1
| align=center| 1:36
| 
| 
|-
| Loss
| align=center| 6–3
| Tony DeSouza
| Decision (unanimous)
| Meca 11: Meca World Vale Tudo 11
| 
| align=center| 3
| align=center| 5:00
| 
| 
|-
| Win
| align=center| 6–2
| Rodrigo Ruas
| TKO (punches)	
| BSF: Brazil Super Fight
| 
| align=center| 1
| align=center| 1:26
| 
| 
|-
| Win
| align=center| 5–2
| Cristiano Marcello
| TKO (knees)
| Meca 6: Meca World Vale Tudo 6
| 
| align=center| 1
| align=center| 8:30
| 
| 
|-
| Win
| align=center| 4–2
| Fabrício Camões
| TKO (punches)
| Meca: World Vale Tudo 3
| 
| align=center| 2
| align=center| 1:36
| 
| 
|-
| Loss
| align=center| 3–2
| Hayato Sakurai
| Decision (unanimous)
| Shooto: R.E.A.D. 8
| 
| align=center| 3
| align=center| 5:00
| 
| 
|-
| Win
| align=center| 3–1
| Anderson Silva
| Decision (unanimous)
| Meca 1: Meca World Vale Tudo 1
| 
| align=center| 2
| align=center| 10:00
| 
| 
|-
| Loss
| align=center| 2–1
| Antonio Antonio
| Decision
| Brazil Free Style: The Best Fighters
| 
| align=center| 1
| align=center| 10:00
| 
| 
|-
| Win
| align=center| 2–0
| Allen Clanton
| TKO (punches)
| Free Style: The Best Fighters
| 
| align=center| 1
| align=center| 5:18
| 
| 
|-
| Win
| align=center| 1–0
| Alexandre Alexandre
| TKO (punches)
| Brazil Free Style: The Best Fighters
| 
| align=center| 1
| align=center| 1:52
| 
|

See also
 List of male mixed martial artists
 List of Pride Fighting events

References

External links
 Chute boxe official site
 

1976 births
Living people
Brazilian male mixed martial artists
Brazilian male kickboxers
Brazilian practitioners of Brazilian jiu-jitsu
Lightweight mixed martial artists
Welterweight mixed martial artists
Mixed martial artists utilizing Brazilian jiu-jitsu
Sportspeople from São Paulo